Nissin Food Products Co., Ltd. is a Japanese international food company that specializes in the production and sale of convenience food and instant noodles.

History

Founding and early years

Ten years later, the company introduced the first instant ramen noodle product, Chikin Ramen (Chicken Ramen). The company established a US subsidiary Nissin Foods in 1970 and, starting in 1972, sold instant ramen noodle products under the name Top Ramen. Instant noodles (1958) and Cup Noodles (1971) were both invented by Momofuku Ando. Nissin Foods has its headquarters in Yodogawa-ku, Osaka.

Recent years and expansion
The company moved to its current headquarters in 1977, when the construction of the building was completed.

In 2007, Myojo Foods Co., Ltd. became a wholly owned subsidiary of Nissin Foods. On January 5, 2007, Nissin founder Momofuku Ando died at the age of 96.

In May 2011, Nissin announced a capital and business alliance with confectionery producer Frente Co., Ltd. In September 2011, the Cup Noodles museum opens in Yokohama, Japan exhibiting the full spectrum of the founder Momofuku Ando's vision.

An agreement with Turkey's largest consumer goods manufacturing group was reached in September 2013, resulting in the creation of Nissin Yildiz Gida Sanayi ve Ticaret A.S.

March 2014 saw the opening of The Wave, a new Japan-based R&D center, aimed at creating "a wave of the most advanced food technologies". The building has been honored with the Good Design Award.

Worldwide sales of the Cup Noodles reached 40 billion servings in 2016; 70% of total sales were accumulated outside Japan.

Name
According to the company, the name 'Nissin' originates as an abbreviated form of the expression 「日々清らかに豊かな味をつくる」 (Hibi kiyoraka ni yutakana aji o tsukuru), coined by company founder Momofuku Ando, and representing his desire for the company. The expression can be loosely translated as "Day after day purely create great taste".

Facilities and regions
Nissin Foods has established offices and factories in various locations, such as the United States (since 1972), Brazil (since 1981), Hong Kong (since 1985), India (since 1987), Hungary (since 1993), Germany (since 1993), Thailand (since 1994), China (since 1995), the Philippines (since 1997) and Mexico (since 2000). In 2013, Makarneks, the Turkish equivalent to Cup Noodles, was introduced. In 2015, Nissin Foods established their subsidiary in Brazil as "Nissin Foods do Brasil" and became the leader of instant noodles producers. Their products are sold in more than 80 countries worldwide.

Products

Instant noodles
 Nissin Top Ramen
 Nissin Chikin Ramen
 Nissin Cup Noodles
 Doll Brand - created by Winner Food Products Limited (est. 1968), a subsidiary of Nissin since 1984
 Chow Mein
 Chow Noodle 
 Bowl Noodles, Rich and Savory, and Hot And Spicy
 Spice Route Bowl and Boxes, Sichuan, Korean, and Thai
NuPasta Bowls and bags
Kitsune udon
Demae Ramen

Demae Ramen
Demae Ramen or Demae Itcho ( which translates to "delivery one order'") was first introduced in Japan in 1969 and entered the market in Hong Kong the next year. Since then, it has become one of the most popular instant noodle brands in Hong Kong, with a wide range of flavours.

Corporate responsibility

Nissin Foods have been criticized for using palm oil suppliers responsible for the destruction of rainforests, peatlands and abuse of human and labor rights. A demonstration was held at Nissin Foods US Headquarters on June 29, 2015.

Non-affiliations
Nissin Foods is not affiliated with the following: Nisshin Seifun Group Inc., Nisshin OilliO Group, Ltd., Nissan Motor Co., Ltd, Nisshinbo Holdings Inc., Nissin Healthcare Food Service Co., Ltd., Monde Nissin Corporation, and Nissin Kyogyo Co. Ltd. (including Nissin Brake Ohio and Nissin Brake Georgia).

See also
 List of instant noodle brands
 Maruchan
 Sapporo Ichiban
 UFO Kamen Yakisoban
 List of companies of Japan

References

External links

 
 Nissin documentary on YouTube

Companies listed on the Osaka Exchange
Companies based in Osaka Prefecture
Food and drink companies established in 1948
Food and drink companies of Japan
Japanese brand foods
Japanese companies established in 1948
Instant noodle brands
1970s initial public offerings
Companies listed on the Tokyo Stock Exchange
Companies listed on the Hong Kong Stock Exchange